Federal elections were held in Switzerland on 28 October 1857. The Radical Left remained the largest group in the National Council, winning 80 of the 120 seats.

Electoral system
The 120 members of the National Council were elected in 49 single- and multi-member constituencies; there was one seat for every 20,000 citizens, with seats allocated to cantons in proportion to their population. The elections were held using a three-round system; candidates had to receive a majority in the first or second round to be elected; if it went to a third round, only a plurality was required. Voters could cast as many votes as there were seats in their constituency. In six cantons (Appenzell Innerrhoden, Appenzell Ausserrhoden, Glarus, Nidwalden, Obwalden and Uri), National Council members were elected by the Landsgemeinde.

Compulsory voting was introduced in the Canton of Schaffhausen for the elections, with the canton seeing the highest turnout at 86.4% compared to the 46.5% figure nationally.

Results

National Council

By constituency

Council of States

References

1857
1857 elections in Europe
1857 in Switzerland